Khanloq or Khanluq or Khanlog or Khan Laq may refer to:
 Khan Laq, North Khorasan
 Khanloq, Razavi Khorasan
 Khanloq, Tehran